Omina no Chichihaha (女之父母) is a description used in the Man'yōshū, a classical Japanese waka anthology, for the authors of poem 3815 contained therein. The "name" translates to "the woman's father and mother", and their poem was a reply to the young man who wrote 3814, requesting the hand of their recently divorced daughter in marriage. They wrote to him that, unfortunately, their daughter had already left to marry someone else.

 has compared the anecdote recounted by these two poems and the surrounding notes) to chapter 24 of the Tales of Ise.

Notes

References

Citations

Works cited 

 
 
 

Man'yō poets
Writing duos